Moses ha-Levi Alkabetz was a prominent rabbi of the first half of the sixteenth century. In around 1530 he officiated as dayan at Safed. He seems also to have studied the Kabbalah, since Isaac ibn Shoshan of Safed wrote a kabbalistic work for him. His son was Solomon Alkabetz of Safed.

Sources
 Its bibliography:
Zunz, Z. G. p. 439
 Conforte, Ḳore ha-Dorot, p. 34a.E.

16th-century rabbis from the Ottoman Empire
Rabbis in Safed
Kabbalists
Levites